Rectus capitis may refer to:

 Rectus capitis anterior muscle
 Rectus capitis lateralis muscle
 Rectus capitis posterior major muscle
 Rectus capitis posterior minor muscle